Stevenson Archer may refer to:

Stevenson Archer (1786–1848), Congressman and judge from Maryland
Stevenson Archer (1827–1898), Congressman from Maryland, and son of Stevenson Archer (1786–1848)